Space Master X-7 is a 1958 American horror science fiction film in  Regalscope from Regal Films, produced by Bernard Glasser, directed by Edward Bernds, that stars Bill Williams, Lyn Thomas, and Robert Ellis. Paul Frees, Judd Holdren, and Moe Howard have supporting roles. The screenplay was written by George Worthing Yates and Daniel Mainwaring.

Plot
A space probe returns to Earth covered with a mysterious fungus, which, when accidentally mixed with human blood, transforms into an ever-growing pile of space rust. If not stopped, the infection could eventually cover the entire world.

Cast 
 Bill Williams as John Hand
 Lyn Thomas as Laura Greeling
 Robert Ellis as Pvt. Joe Rattigan
 Paul Frees as Dr. Charles T. Pommer
 Rhoda Williams as Stewardess Archer
 Joan Barry as Jean Meyers, a brunet
 Carol Varga as Elaine Frohman
 Thomas Browne Henry as Prof. West
 Thomas Wilde as Collins
 Fred Sherman as Mr. Morse, Hotel Manager 
 Gregg Martell as Jim Dale, plane engineer
 Jess Kirkpatrick as Pilot Vaccarino
 Court Shepard as Battalion Fire Chief Hendry
 Moe Howard as Retlinger, the Cab Driver
 Al Baffert as Plane passenger

Production
After making several Westerns for Regal Pictures, director Ed Bernds and producer Bernard Glasser thought they would make a science fiction picture.

Bernds says the script was written on "spec" by Daniel Mainwaring and George Worthing Yates. Bernard Glasser bought it and director Bernds rewrote the script without credit because the original was written for a feature film with a larger budget and a longer running time. Bernds said the film's total budget was $90,000.

Glasser, however, recalled that Space Master X-7 was budgeted at $125,000, with $25,000 going to the screenwriters.

The film was rushed into production to take advantage of the Explorer I satellite space launch. Regal's head of publicity, Marty Weiser, recommended they change the title from Missile into Space to the more exciting-sounding Space Master X-7.

Harry Spalding, who was Robert L. Lippert's story editor, recalls the filmmakers went over budget but did a good job, so good they were hired for The Return of the Fly (1959).

Moe Howard, who made a cameo appearance in the film in a notable departure from his slapstick performances, had worked previously with Bernds on his Three Stooges shorts and asked if the production crew had a position for his son-in-law Norman Maurer. Maurer would work as the film's production assistant received $1,000.00 for his efforts. In fact, Glasser was so impressed with Maurer's work that he recommended him to producer Sidney Pink for Pink's upcoming science fiction film, The Angry Red Planet (1959).

Legacy
A Space Master X-7 video game was announced in 1983 for the Atari 2600 by Fox's video game publishing arm. It was not based on the film; programmer David Lubar had not even heard of the 1958 film before Fox decided to attach its title to an original game he had developed. The game's Atari 8-bit family port, published by Sirius Software that same year, was released as Alpha Shield, dropping the film connection entirely.

References

Bibliography
 Warren, Bill. Keep Watching the Skies! American Science Fiction Movies of the Fifties (covers films released through 1962), 21st Century Edition. Jefferson, North Carolina: McFarland & Company, 2009 (First Edition 1982).

External links
 
 
 

1958 films
1950s science fiction films
American black-and-white films
American science fiction films
20th Century Fox films
1950s English-language films
Films directed by Edward Bernds
1950s American films